This article lists all power stations in Suriname.

Hydroelectric

Thermal

See also 

 List of largest power stations in the world
 List of power stations in South America

References 

Suriname
 
Power stations